Tystberga (local pronunciation Tystbärja) is a locality situated in Nyköping Municipality, Södermanland County, Sweden with 828 inhabitants as of 2010.

Elections 
Tystberga is the seat of the namesake electoral ward.

Riksdag

References 

Populated places in Södermanland County
Populated places in Nyköping Municipality